Bansi Lal Legha (26 August 1927 – 28 March 2006) was an Indian independence activist, senior Congress leader, former Chief Minister of Haryana, former Defence Minister of India, and the architect of modern Haryana. Bansi Lal was part of the famous Lal trio of Haryana which also included 'Tau' Devi Lal and Bhajan Lal, that form the major Political families of Haryana.

Lal was elected to the Haryana State Assembly seven times, the first time in 1967 from Tosham. He served three separate terms as Chief Minister of Haryana: 1968–75, 1986–87, and 1996–99. Bansi Lal was considered a close confidante of former Prime Minister Indira Gandhi and her son Sanjay Gandhi during the Emergency era of 1975 -1977. 

His younger son died at 59 in 2005

He served as the Defence Minister of India from December 1975 to March 1977, and had a brief stint as a Minister without Portfolio in the Union government in 1975. He also held the Railways and Transport portfolios.

He set up Haryana Vikas Party after parting ways with the Indian National Congress in 1996. He returned to Congress in 2004, and helped the Congress to win the 2005 Assembly elections.

Early life
He was born on 26 August 1927 to Choudhary Mohar Singh and Shrimati Vidya Devi belonging to Hindu Jat community
in the village of Golagarh in Bhiwani district, British Punjab (now Haryana). Following his marriage, Lal had two sons, Surendra Singh, and Ranbir Singh Mahendra.

Education
Bansi Lal did his BA in arts, followed by LLB (law degree), for which he studied at the Punjab University Law College, Jalandhar.

Political career

Lal was secretary of Parja mandal in the Loharu State, from 1943 to 1944.
Lal was president of the Bar Association, Bhiwani from 1957 to 1958. He was president of the District Congress Committee, Hisar, from 1959 to 1962 and later became a member of the Congress Working Committee and Congress Parliamentary Board.
He was a member of the Punjab Pradesh Congress Committee between 1958 and 1962.
He was Haryana's Chief Minister : from 1968 to 1975 (Congress), 1985 to 1987 (Congress), and 1996 to 1999 with Haryana Vikas Party.
He was the Defence Minister of India from December 1975 to March 1977.
He was also the chairman of the Committee of Parliament and Committee on Public Undertakings, 1980–82, and the Committee on Estimates, 1982–84.
He became Railways minister of India on 31 December 1984 in Rajiv Gandhi's ministry and later minister for transport.
He was elected to the Haryana State Assembly five times from Tosham (1967, 1972, 1986 bye-poll, 1991, 1996). He lost once from Tosham in 1987 Devi Lal wave, just a few months after winning the seat with more than 80,000 votes in 1986.
He was a Rajya Sabha member from 1960 to 1966 and 1976 to 1980. He was a Lok Sabha member from Bhiwani three times : 1980 to 1984, 1985 to 1986, and 1989 to 1991. He lost from Bhiwani in 1977 due to the Janata wave.
After he parted company with Congress in 1996, Bansi Lal set up the Haryana Vikas Party and his campaign against prohibition propelled him to power in the assembly polls the same year.
Chronologically : Rajya Sabha MP (1960-1966), Haryana MLA (1967-1975), Rajya Sabha (1976-1980 but lost Bhiwani Lok Sabha election in 1977), Lok Sabha MP from 1980-1984, 1984-1986, Haryana MLA 1986-1987, lost assembly election in 1987, became Lok Sabha MP 1989-1991, Haryana MLA 1991-1996 and 1996 to 2000.

Chief Minister of Haryana
Bansi Lal became the Chief Minister of Haryana four times in 1968, 1972, 1986 and 1996. He was the third chief minister of Haryana after Bhagwat Dayal Sharma and Rao Birender Singh. He became Haryana chief minister for the first time on 31 May 1968 at the age of 41 making him the youngest chief minister in the country at the time, and remained in office till 13 March 1972. On 14 March 1972, he occupied the top post in the state for the second time and was in office till 29 November 1975. The third and fourth times he was appointed chief minister was from 5 June 1986 to 19 June 1987 and 11 May 1996 to 23 July 1999.

Bansi Lal was elected to the state assembly seven times, the first time being in 1967. After Haryana was formed in 1966, much of the state's industrial and agricultural development, especially creation of infrastructure, took place due to Lal's initiatives. He was elected to the state assembly for seven times in 1967, 1968, 1972, 1986, 1991 and 2000.

He was responsible for electrifying all villages in Haryana during his tenure as chief minister in the late sixties and seventies. He was also the pioneer of highway tourism in the state – a model later adopted by a number of states. He is regarded by many as an "Iron man" who was always close to reality and took keen interest in the upliftment of the community. Lal became one of the first Chief Ministers to visit Israel, when he led a delegation of agriculturalists and sarpanches to the country in 1971.

Even before the emergency he ruled the state of Haryana in an authoritarian fashion, within the first six and a half years of his rule as chief minister, the Haryana police took into custody more than 143,000 people, including many of his political opponents. He was known to dislike journalists and press especially those critical of him. Two months before the emergency he sent his goons with a senior municipal officer to demolish the offices of Chetna, a Bhiwani based newspaper which was critical of him, and one day after the Emergency was declared arrested it's editor Devabrata Vasisht along with his father. In other instances he tamed press critical of him like the Tribune at Chandigarh, by denying it government advertisements and using the police to fine vehicles that carried the paper to Haryana.

In 1974, Bansi Lal's son, Surender Singh along with a police escort stormed into the house of Bhanwar Singh, a student union leader at Bhiwani college, in Rewasa. They dragged Bhanwar, his sister, and his grandmother, the two siblings were stripped naked and made to lie on the same cot, while Bhanwar's grandmother was kicked to death. The journalist Makhan Lal Kak who reported this story was locked up on the very first day of the emergency, while the deputy superintendent who took part in this was given a promotion.

Bansi Lal also brought the Maruti Car project to Haryana, which was Sanjay Gandhi's pet project, he provided over 297.3 acres of land for Maruti factory in the district of Gurgaon, of which 157 acres belonged to the Ministry of Defense, and 140 acres were highly fertile and populated land that belonged to many farmers. He also provided Maruti a government loan to cover the costs of this purchase. To this end 15,000 farmers were evicted.

Bansi Lal did not contest the assembly elections in 2005 but his sons Surender Singh and Ranbir Singh Mahendra were elected to the state assembly. Surender Singh died in a helicopter crash near Saharanpur in Uttar Pradesh on 31 March 2005.

Role during Emergency
Lal was in the limelight when Emergency was imposed by the then Prime Minister Indira Gandhi in 1975. He was a confidante of Indira Gandhi and her son Sanjay Gandhi during the controversial Emergency days in 1975. He was part of a cabal around Sanjay Gandhi, along with V C Shukla, Om Mehta, et al., which came to be known as 'the Emergency caucus'. This group, led by Sanjay Gandhi, was said to be responsible for various harsh steps during the Emergency.

He was the defence minister from 21 December 1975 to 24 March 1977 and a minister without portfolio in the Union government from 1 December 1975 to 20 December 1975. The Shah Commission of Inquiry which was formed at end of the Emergency noted that Lal often misused his official position for personal reasons.

Death
Lal died in New Delhi on 28 March 2006 at the age of 78. He had been unwell for quite some time.

Awards and honours
In 1972, the Kurukshetra University and the Haryana Agricultural University awarded him honorary degrees of Doctor of Law and Doctor of Science respectively.

Legacy

In 2008, the Jui canal was named the Bansi Lal Canal in his memory.
In 2014, Chaudhary Bansi Lal University was created in Bhiwani in his memory.

Prominent Family Members 

Lal's elder son, Ranbir Singh Mahendra served as President of Board for Control of Cricket in India (BCCI).
Lal's younger son, Chaudhary Surender Singh served as a politician from the Haryana Vikas Party and twice (1996, 1998) represented Bhiwani constituency in the Lok Sabha, was a Rajya Sabha member 1986–1992, and twice represented Tosham in Haryana Vidhan Sabha.
Positions held:
1971-73 General-Secretary, District Congress Committee (D.C.C.), Bhiwani

1973-77 Treasurer, Indian Youth Congress

1977-86 Member, Haryana Vidhan Sabha

1982-83 Cabinet Minister, Agriculture and Wildlife Preservation, Haryana

1986-92 Member, Rajya Sabha

Member, Committee on Petitions

Member, House Committee

Member, Consultative Committee, Ministry of Civil Aviation

Member, Consultative Committee, Ministry of Defence

1989-90 Member, Public Accounts Committee

1996 Elected to 11th Lok Sabha

1996-97 Member, Committee on Human Resource Development

Member, Railway Convention Committee

Member, Hindi Salahakar Samiti, Ministry of Environment and Forests

Member, Committee on Science and Technology, Environment and Forests

Member, Consultative Committee, Ministry of Defence

1998 Re-elected to 12th Lok Sabha (2nd term)

1998-99 Member, Committee on Subordinate Legislation

Member, Committee on Public Undertakings

Member, Committee on Communications its Sub Committee 'A' on Department of Telecom

Member, Consultative Committee, Ministry of Civil Aviation

Lal's younger son's wife, Mrs. Kiran Choudhry, is a Member of the Legislative Assembly (2005,2009, 2014) from Tosham constituency. She was cabinet minister in Bhupinder Singh Hooda's government from 2009–14. 
Lal's grand daughter, Mrs. Shruti Choudhry, was a Member of the Parliament (2009) from Bhiwani constituency. She lost the 2014 general elections from same constituency.

See also
 Aaya Ram Gaya Ram
 Dynastic politics of Haryana

References

 Bansi Lal: Chief Minister of Haryana By S. R. Bakshi, Sita Ram Sharma 1998 

1927 births
2006 deaths
People from Bhiwani district
People from Bhiwani
Chief Ministers of Haryana
Railway Ministers of India
Defence Ministers of India
Members of the Cabinet of India
India MPs 1980–1984
India MPs 1984–1989
India MPs 1989–1991
Rajya Sabha members from Punjab, India
India MPs 1991–1996
Lok Sabha members from Haryana
Indian independence activists from Haryana
Chief ministers from Indian National Congress
People of the Emergency (India)
Haryana Vikas Party politicians